The Somerset Hills Regional School District is a comprehensive regional public school district serving students in pre-kindergarten through twelfth grade from four communities in Somerset County, New Jersey, United States. The district serves students from the boroughs of Bernardsville, Far Hills and Peapack-Gladstone, along with students from the township of Bedminster (grades 9–12) who attend the district's high school as part of a sending/receiving relationship.

As of the 2020–21 school year, the district, comprised of three schools, had an enrollment of 1,797 students and 155.3 classroom teachers (on an FTE basis), for a student–teacher ratio of 11.6:1.

The district is classified by the New Jersey Department of Education as being in District Factor Group "I", the second-highest of eight groupings. District Factor Groups organize districts statewide to allow comparison by common socioeconomic characteristics of the local districts. From lowest socioeconomic status to highest, the categories are A, B, CD, DE, FG, GH, I and J.

Schools 
Schools in the district (with 2020–21 enrollment data from the National Center for Education Statistics) are:
Elementary school
Marion T. Bedwell Elementary School with 471 students in grades PreK–4
Amy G. Phelan, Principal
Middle school
Bernardsville Middle School with 474 students in grades 5–8
Lisa Garafalo, Principal
High school
Bernards High School with 819 students in grades 9–12
Scott Neigel, Principal

Administration 
Core members of the district's administration are:
Dr. Gretchen Dempsey, Superintendent
Jinnee DeMarco, Business Administrator / Board Secretary

Board of education
The district's board of education is comprised of nine elected members (and one appointed member) who set policy and oversee the fiscal and educational operation of the district through its administration. As a Type II school district, the board's trustees are elected directly by voters to serve three-year terms of office on a staggered basis, with three seats up for election each year held (since 2012) as part of the November general election. The board appoints a superintendent to oversee the district's day-to-day operations and a business administrator to supervise the business functions of the district. The seats on the board are allocated to the constituent municipalities based on population, with six seats assigned to Bernardsville, two to Peapack-Gladstone and one to Far Hills, with an additional representative appointed from the sending district of Bedminster.

References

External links
Somerset Hills School District

Data for the Somerset Hills School District, National Center for Education Statistics

Bernardsville, New Jersey
Far Hills, New Jersey
Peapack-Gladstone, New Jersey
New Jersey District Factor Group I
School districts in Somerset County, New Jersey